Bilorichenskyi is an urban-type settlement in Luhansk Raion (district) in Luhansk Oblast of eastern Ukraine. Population:

Demographics
Native language distribution as of the Ukrainian Census of 2001:
 Ukrainian: 24.81%
 Russian: 74.73%
 Others: 0.31%

References

Urban-type settlements in Luhansk Raion